Operation Mincemeat is a 2021 British war drama film directed by John Madden. It is based upon Ben Macintyre's book on the British Operation Mincemeat during the Second World War. The film stars Colin Firth, Kelly Macdonald, Matthew Macfadyen, Penelope Wilton, Johnny Flynn and Jason Isaacs. This was Paul Ritter's final film appearance, and was dedicated to his memory.

The film had its world premiere at the 2021 British Film Festival in Australia, and was released in the United Kingdom on 15 April 2022 by Warner Bros. Pictures. It was released on Netflix in North American and South American countries on 11 May 2022.

Plot
In 1943, the United Kingdom is deeply entrenched in World War II. Lieutenant Commander Ewen Montagu, a Jewish barrister, remains in England while his wife, Iris, and children travel to safety in the United States. Montagu takes a hiatus from practising law when he is appointed to the Twenty Committee. His loyal secretary, Hester Leggett, comes with him.

British Prime Minister Winston Churchill has promised the United States that the Allies will invade Sicily by July of that year in order to push northward into Europe. However, Sicily is considered an obvious target and may be defended by the Wehrmacht. Admiral Godfrey informs the Twenty Committee that Britain must trick Nazi Germany into believing the Allies will invade Greece. Charles Cholmondeley proposes an operation from the Trout Memo, which would entail a corpse carrying false secrets and washing ashore. Despite Godfrey's doubts, he gives Montagu and Cholmondeley permission to plan the operation with Lieutenant Commander Ian Fleming.

Operation Mincemeat sets up an office. As planning gets underway, Montagu and Cholmondeley obtain the body of a vagrant named Glyndwr Michael, who died by possible suicidal poisoning. The team gives him the false identity of Major William Martin, Royal Marines, complete with a detailed backstory, ID photos, and an engagement. A widowed secretary in the office, Jean Leslie, offers a photo of herself to serve as the fake fiancée. Cholmondeley has a crush on Jean, but soon realises that Montagu and Jean have romantic feelings for one another. This causes Cholmondeley to grow jealous and occasionally lash out at Montagu.

Godfrey suspects Montagu's brother, Ivor, is a spy for Russia. He bribes Cholmondeley to spy on Montagu and, in return, Godfrey will locate and return the remains of Cholmondeley's brother, who was killed in action in Chittagong, Bengal. Cholmondeley reluctantly agrees.

Specialist MI5 driver St John "Jock" Horsfall transports Montagu, Cholmondeley, and the corpse to the R.N. Submarine Base in Holy Loch. The corpse is then loaded onto the submarine HMS Seraph, under the command of Lt. Bill Jewell. On the morning of 30 April, the Seraph arrives in the Gulf of Cádiz and drops the corpse into the ocean. It is found by fishermen in Huelva, Spain. Operation Mincemeat attempts to get the fake documents to Madrid. However, the mission is hampered by bad luck, as the Spanish have resisted Nazi corruption better than expected. Captain David Ainsworth, the British naval attaché in Madrid, meets with Colonel Cerruti of the Spanish secret police in one last attempt to get the papers to the Nazis. When Martin's personal items are returned to London, a specialist at Q Branch figures out that the documents were tampered with. This gives Operation Mincemeat hope that Germany retrieved the false information.

Jean is ambushed and threatened by Teddy, a man claiming to be a spy for an anti-Hitler plot within Germany. She tells him that Major Martin was travelling under an alias but the classified information was genuine. After Teddy leaves, Jean informs Montagu and Cholmondeley. They come to believe that Colonel Alexis von Roenne, who controls intelligence in the Nazi High Command, sent Teddy to verify information so Von Roenne could undermine Hitler. However, they have no way of being completely sure. Montagu takes Jean to his home for protection, but she accepts a job in Special Operations and soon leaves London.

On 10 July, the Allied invasion of Sicily commences. The news arrives that the Allied Forces suffered limited casualties, the enemy is retreating, and the beaches have been held. Afterwards, Cholmondeley admits he received his brother's remains in return for spying on Montagu. Feeling sympathetic and relieved that Operation Mincemeat was a success, Montagu offers to buy Cholmondeley a drink even though it is eight in the morning.

The epilogue explains that Montagu reunited with Iris after the war, Jean married a soldier, Hester continued as Director of the Admiralty Secretarial Unit, and Cholmondeley remained with MI5 until 1952, later married, and travelled widely. Major William Martin's identity was revealed to be Glyndwr Michael in 1997 when an epitaph, with his real name, was added to Martin's headstone in Spain.

Cast

In addition, other notable historical figures are briefly included in the film, with Alexander Beyer as Karl Kuhlenthal, Nico Birnbaum as Colonel Alexis von Roenne and  Pep Tosar as Admiral Moreno.

Production
It was announced in May 2019 that the film would be directed by John Madden, and Colin Firth would star. Kelly Macdonald joined the film in October. In December, Matthew Macfadyen, Penelope Wilton, Johnny Flynn, Tom Wilkinson, Hattie Morahan, Simon Russell Beale, Paul Ritter and Mark Gatiss were added to the cast. Jason Isaacs was announced as part of the cast in March 2020.

Principal photography began in December 2019 between London and Spain.
Filming locations include a battle scene at Saunton Beach in North Devon in February 2020 and a scene in Málaga in March 2021.

The film was Paul Ritter's final appearance prior to his death, and it is dedicated to his memory.

Historicity 

Although the main thrust of the film is historically accurate, the filmmakers made some omissions and additions that were not in MacIntyre's book, including the creation of a fictional sub-plot involving a love triangle between Montagu, Cholmondeley and Leslie.

Release
In February 2021, Warner Bros. International acquired the Operation Mincemeat distribution rights in the UK. The film had its world premiere at the 2021 British Film Festival in Australia, and was released in cinemas on 15 April 2022. Netflix purchased the rights to the film in North America and South America, and it was released on the streaming service in those territories on 11 May 2022.

Reception
On the review aggregator website Rotten Tomatoes, 84% of 112 critics' reviews are positive, with an average rating of 6.6/10. The website's critical consensus reads, "If its fact-based story proves more fascinatingly outlandish than it's presented here, Operation Mincemeat remains an engaging and well-acted wartime drama." Metacritic, which uses a weighted average, assigned the film a score of 65 out of 100 based on 27 critics, indicating "generally favorable reviews".

See also
The Man Who Never Was, 1956 film based on Ewen Montagu's book of the same name about Operation Mincemeat

Notes

References

External links
 

Cultural depictions of Winston Churchill
2021 films
2021 drama films
British historical drama films
British war drama films
Films directed by John Madden
Films scored by Thomas Newman
Films set in 1943
Films set in Andalusia
Films set in London
Films set in Madrid
Films set in Scotland
Films set in Sicily
Films shot in London
Films shot in Spain
World War II films based on actual events
Operation Mincemeat
2020s English-language films
2020s British films